Tebay Services are motorway service stations on the M6 motorway in the Eden district of Cumbria, England. The northbound opened in 1972 and the southbound in 1993. They are known for their family-run business which eschews the typical facilities at British motorway services for a farm shop and buildings in keeping with the local environment.

Location
The services are between junctions 38 and 39, on the ascent from the Lune Valley to Shap summit. As the north and southbound carriageways diverge at this point, the two service areas are not actually adjacent to each other but  a couple of hundred metres apart.  The services are a mile north of junction 38, which is adjacent to the village of Tebay, although the services are in the civil parish of Orton.

History
Tebay West Services, which serves the northbound carriageway, opened in 1972, two years after the M6 section between Lancaster and Penrith was completed. The M6 here passes through an environmentally sensitive area, and the services were sited in this location to fit in with the surrounding local area and provide a view away from the motorway. A corresponding southbound services, Killington Lake Services, was constructed at the same time.

Tebay East was opened in 1993, serving southbound traffic. Both are operated by an independent family-owned company, Westmorland Motorway Services, rather than a national chain. The same company runs Truckstop Services at junction 38 (just off the B6260 at Old Tebay), which opened in 1986 and caters for HGV and long-distance coaches, and Gloucester Services between junctions 11a and 12 of the M5 in Gloucestershire, which was built into the side of a hill and covered with grass to reduce its visual impact.

Facilities
Tebay Services are in open countryside surrounded by trees, small lakes and panoramas of the Cumbrian landscape, and has its own duck pond. Westmorland shun typical motorway service food outlets. Instead, both Tebay outlets have award-winning farm shops, which sell local meat and other food, and insist on using local suppliers. The services have been praised as being the best in the country. In 2003, Westmorland won Best Local Retailer in BBC Radio 4's Food and Farming Awards, and in 2006 they were awarded Best Motorway Services in Britain by Which?. The farm shops, which sell locally sourced produce, were officially opened by Prince Charles in 2004.

In addition, the northbound service area has a caravan park and a hotel. This site also serves as the head office for Westmorland Motorway Services.

Testimonials

Comedian Gary Delaney has described Tebay Services as "...the Daniel Kitson of services", a reference to comedian Daniel Kitson's reputation as an accomplished comedic writer and performer who rarely appears in the media and therefore relies greatly on word of mouth.

Fellow comedian Frank Skinner proclaimed on his Absolute radio show that “if there is a road to heaven, Tebay Services would be the service station on that road”.

References

External links
Westmorland Limited — Tebay Services
Tebay Services — Motorway Services Online
Motorway "Trivia" site for: West services and East
Tebay northbound and southbound services at MotorwayServices.info

1972 establishments in England
M6 motorway service stations
Buildings and structures in Cumbria
Transport in Cumbria
Westmorland
Orton, Eden
Tebay